Lozotaenia is a genus of moths in the tribe  Archipini.

Species
Lozotaenia basilea Karisch, 2008
Lozotaenia capensana (Walker, 1863)
Lozotaenia capitana (Felder & Rogenhofer, 1875)
Lozotaenia cedrivora Chambon, in ChambonFabre & Khemeci, 1990
Lozotaenia coniferana (Issiki, in Issiki & Mutuura, 1961)
Lozotaenia costinotana Franclemont, 1986
Lozotaenia cupidinana (Staudinger, 1859)
Lozotaenia cyanombra (Meyrick, 1935)
Lozotaenia djakonovi Danilevsky, 1963
Lozotaenia edwardi Razowski, 1999
Lozotaenia edwardsi (Bradley, 1965)
Lozotaenia exomilana Franclemont, 1986
Lozotaenia forsterana (Fabricius, 1781)
Lozotaenia hesperia Powell, 1962
Lozotaenia karchana Razowski & Trematerra, 2010
Lozotaenia kumatai Oku, 1963
Lozotaenia manticopa (Meyrick, 1934)
Lozotaenia melanophragma (Meyrick, 1936)
Lozotaenia myriosema (Meyrick, 1936)
Lozotaenia perapposita Razowski, 1984
Lozotaenia retiana (Turati, 1913)
Lozotaenia rindgei Obraztsov, 1962
Lozotaenia sciarrettae Razowski & Trematerra, 2010
Lozotaenia straminea (Schawerda, 1936)

See also
List of Tortricidae genera

References

 , 1829, Nom. Br. Insects 46
 , 2005: World catalogue of insects volume 5 Tortricidae.
  2010: An annotated catalogue of the types of Tortricidae (Lepidoptera) in the collection of the Royal Museum for Central Africa (Tervuren, Belgium) with descriptions of new genera and new species. Zootaxa 2469: 1-77. Abstract: .
 , 2010:  Tortricidae (Lepidoptera) from Ethiopia Journal of Entomological and Acarological Research Serie II, 42 (2): 47-79. Abstract: .

External links
tortricidae.com

Archipini
Tortricidae genera